IV is the fourth studio album by American rock band Godsmack, released on April 25, 2006. This is Godsmack's only studio album produced by Andy Johns.

Recording and lyrical themes
According to Sully Erna: "This is the first time I've been totally honest, speaking the truth about real situations," he says. "In the past I was always pointing a finger, whether at myself or someone else, but I've come clean with myself and the people I can now love and care about.

This record is about the light at the end of the tunnel, coming out of that funk, recognizing the dark parts of our lives, but committing to finding a way out of them."

With legendary engineer Andy Johns, who worked on such Led Zeppelin classics as "Stairway to Heaven" and "When the Levee Breaks", as well as albums by the Rolling Stones and Van Halen, Godsmack transitions from their metal roots to full-fledged classic blues-rockers.

Recorded at Spiral Recording Studio in Los Angeles, Godsmack had the luxury, for the first time, of writing and recording IV without being on the road or having to rush to meet a deadline. They wrote 35 tracks, recorded 17, and picked the best of them to go on the disc.

"There were a lot of things that happened on this record that were different than the way we worked in the past," explains Erna. "And one of those was me letting go of the steering wheel a bit, allowing the band control over the writing and me stepping away to an outside point of view and coming up with lyrics for what I viewed as another group entirely," he says.

The lyrical themes, about speaking the truth and coming clean, are echoed in "Livin' in Sin", a song that inspired Erna to reveal to his girlfriend his infidelities, a theme he also explores in "The Enemy". "I was blocked for months," he says. "Writing that song opened up the floodgates and made me realize what this record was about."

"Shine Down" was another example of the band wrenching light from dark. "That one's not just a song of hope, but of realistic expectations," explains Erna. "It's about being human and having problems. About not being able to lift your head off the pillow, but knowing there's somebody out there that watches over us and a universe that protects us. I knew this new year would be rocking for us. It's not religious, but spiritual."

"Voodoo Too" is a sequel to their prior single "Voodoo", and features a bit of the ending of "Voodoo" in the beginning in the song.

Title
The album's minimalist name "IV" derives not only from its being the band's fourth studio album, but also from a running piece of backstage humor, as related by Larkin and Erna:

Commercial performance
IV sold 211,000 copies in the U.S. in its first week of release, debuting at #1 on the Billboard 200 chart. This figure is a bit less than the 267,000 units sold by Godsmack's third studio album, Faceless, back in April 2003, and the 256,000 first-week tally achieved by 2000's Awake. IV also debuted at number four on the Top Canadian Albums and number one on the Top Internet Albums.

Track listing

Personnel
Godsmack
 Sully Erna – lead vocals, rhythm guitar, harmonica, production, talk box on "No Rest for the Wicked" and "Safe and Sound"
 Tony Rombola – lead guitar, backing vocals
 Robbie Merrill – bass
 Shannon Larkin – drums, percussion

Additional
P. R. Brown – package design
Kent Hertz – engineering, digital editing
Andy Johns – production, engineering, mixing
Clay Patrick McBride – photography
Dave Schultz – mastering
Kevin Sheehy – personal assistant
Doug Strub – engineering

Charts

Weekly charts

Year-end charts

Singles

Certifications

References

2006 albums
Albums produced by Andy Johns
Godsmack albums
Republic Records albums